Diona Reasonover (born January 6, 1992) is an American actress. She starred as Charmaine Eskowitz in the television show Clipped. She portrays Kasie Hines in the crime drama series NCIS.

Early life
Born and raised in Detroit, Michigan, Reasonover attended Renaissance High School. While in high school, she was a member of Mosaic Youth Theatre, a group of over 100 teenagers who performed in Detroit and internationally.

Reasonover attended Oberlin College and graduated with a bachelor's degree in theater and dance. She also earned a Master of Fine Arts in acting from the California Institute of the Arts. She worked as a barista while in school.

Career
In 2010, Reasonover starred in HYPERBOLE: origins at [Inside] the Ford as a part of the Los Angeles-based art collective Rogue Artists Ensemble.

Reasonover acted in Lydia R. Diamond's play Stick Fly with Mo'olelo Performing Arts at San Diego's 10th Avenue Theatre in 2011. Reasonover played Cheryl, the daughter of a family's maid whose life has been dramatically changed by an all-expense-paid prep school education. Calling her performance "superb", a theater reviewer for the North County Times said she was "brainy, proud, and easily wounded, and she offers much of the show's comic relief". A reviewer for the San Diego Examiner called Reasonover "a formidable force to be reckoned with". A reviewer for The San Diego Union-Tribune called her performance "quietly fiery". Reasonover received an award at the Tenth Annual Craig Noel Awards for Theatrical Excellence.

At Upright Citizens Brigade, Reasonover is a member of improvisation group Ham Radio, which performs around Los Angeles. She is also a member of the long-form improvisation group Essence.

Reasonover starred as Charmaine Eskowitz in the television series Clipped. She patterned the character on her sister Elisa.

Reasonover also did the voice of Mary-Anne in Doris & Mary-Anne Are Breaking Out of Prison.

Reasonover appeared as Kasie Hines in three episodes of the CBS crime drama NCIS in a recurring role for Season 15. She was upped to a series regular for Season 16 following the departure of Pauley Perrette.

Filmography

Film

Television

Personal life

She is openly lesbian and married Patricia Villetto in 2018.

References

External links

1992 births
African-American actresses
American lesbian actresses
American television actresses
American women comedians
Actresses from Detroit
California Institute of the Arts alumni
Lesbian comedians
Living people
Oberlin College alumni
LGBT African Americans
LGBT people from Michigan
Upright Citizens Brigade Theater performers
Renaissance High School alumni
21st-century American comedians
21st-century American actresses
21st-century African-American women
21st-century African-American people
21st-century LGBT people
American LGBT comedians